George Dewey Nye (August 6, 1898 – January 27, 1969), born in Waverly, Ohio, was an American politician of the Democratic party.

During World War I, Nye served in the United States Navy. In 1928, Nye ran for a seat in the United States House of Representatives, losing to incumbent Republican Charles C. Kearns. In 1929, he was elected to a common pleas court judgeship, in which he served from 1930 to 1937. In 1938, Nye was a member of the Ohio Democratic State Central Committee. In 1940, he served as an alternate delegate to the Democratic National Convention.

In 1942 and the six succeeding elections, Nye was nominated by the Democratic party for the office of lieutenant governor of Ohio. He won three two-year terms to the office in two separate tenures, serving as the 48th and 50th lieutenant governor, from 1945 to 1947 and from 1949 to 1953.

Nye died of complications of hip surgery in 1969 at Massachusetts General Hospital. He was 70.

See also

Election Results, U.S. Representative from Ohio, 6th District
Election Results, Ohio Lieutenant Governor

References

Lieutenant Governors of Ohio
1898 births
1969 deaths
Ohio Democrats
People from Waverly, Ohio
United States Navy personnel of World War I
United States Navy sailors
20th-century American politicians